Ranatra kirkaldyi is a species of waterscorpion in the family Nepidae. It is found in North America.

Subspecies
These two subspecies belong to the species Ranatra kirkaldyi:
 Ranatra kirkaldyi hoffmanni Hungerford, 1922
 Ranatra kirkaldyi kirkaldyi Torre-Bueno, 1905

References

Articles created by Qbugbot
Insects described in 1905
Nepidae